Anu Joseph (born 23 December 1985) is an Indian actress in the Malayalam television industry. She made her acting debut in Paadam Onnu: Oru Vilapam directed by T. V. Chandran.

Career
Anu Joseph won the Kalathilakam title in the school Youth Festival and became the part of Kalabhavan dance troupe to perform classical art forms and started getting offers from serials. Anu made her debut in the serial Chithralekha aired on Surya TV and later went on to do many popular serials including Makalude Amma, Minnukettu, Aalilathaali, Snehachandhrika, Pazhassi Raja and Oridathoridathu. While she plays an innocent and sweet girl in Alilathaali, she portrays a pretentious woman in Oridathoridathu. However, it was through Minnukettu that she got noticed. Her breakthrough role was Advocate Sathyabhama in Karyam Nissaram.

Television

TV serials

Other shows

 Drama
Kalathil Dineshan

Albums
Karuthalanu Karuth
Girl Friend
Manikyakkallu
Vennila Manath
Kadathu Thonikkaran
Vaadiyathanelum Poovalle Fathima
Piriyatha Sneham
Sree Bhadrakali
Ithanente Mannu Ithanente Thalam
 Sarwa Mangalle
 Thamarakannan
 Pallival
 Srivishnumayarchana
 Onapookkalam

Filmography

References

External links 
  
 

Living people
21st-century Indian actresses
Actresses in Malayalam television
Actresses in Malayalam cinema
Actresses from Kerala
Indian television actresses
Indian women television presenters
Indian film actresses
1985 births